Calothamnus graniticus, commonly known as granite claw flower, is a plant in the myrtle family, Myrtaceae and is endemic to the south-west of Western Australia. There are two subspecies, both of which have been classified as "near threatened". It is an erect, rounded shrub with pine-like, dark, grey-green foliage and usually bright red flowers. Calothamnus graniticus subsp. graniticus occurs in the Leeuwin-Naturaliste National Park and is the floral emblem of the nearby city of Busselton. (In 2014 Craven, Edwards and Cowley proposed that the species be renamed Melaleuca granitica.)

Description
They are covered with short, white hairs giving the leaves a greyish tinge.

The flowers are usually bright red, sometimes cream coloured, and are arranged in clusters or irregular spikes containing 2 to 25 individual flowers, mostly on old, leafless wood.

Taxonomy and naming
Calothamnus graniticus was first formally described in 1984 by Trevor Hawkeswood in the botanical journal Nuytsia. The specific epithet (graniticus) refers to the fact that this species always grows in soil derived from granite.

There are two subspecies:

 Calothamnus graniticus subsp. leptophyllus (Benth.) Hawkeswood  has leaves  in diameter, flowers in clusters or spikes of up to 25 and occurs in the area between Dwellingup and Collie. (It had originally been described in 1867 by George Bentham as a variety of Calothamnus torulosus.)

Distribution and habitat
Calothamnus graniticus occurs in and between the Cape Naturaliste, Dwellingup and Collie areas in the Jarrah Forest biogeographic region where it grows in sandy soils derived from granite.

Conservation
Calothamnus graniticus is classified as "priority 4" by the Western Australian government Department of Parks and Wildlife meaning that it is rare or near threatened.

Use in horticulture
Calothamnus graniticus is an attractive shrub growing well in warm climates and in a sunny position. Propagation is easy from seed and the mature plant responds well to pruning.

References

graniticus
Myrtales of Australia
Plants described in 1984
Endemic flora of Western Australia